Namtsy (Nam) is a rural locality (a selo), the administrative center of Namsky District and the only inhabited locality, as well as the administrative center, of Lensky Rural Okrug of Namsky District in the Sakha Republic, Russia. Its population as of the 2010 Census was 8,890, up from 8,249 recorded during the 2002 Census.

References

Notes

Sources
Official website of the Sakha Republic. Registry of the Administrative-Territorial Divisions of the Sakha Republic. Namsky District. 

Rural localities in Namsky District
Populated places on the Lena River